The third season of the television comedy series The Middle began airing on September 21, 2011 and concluded on May 23, 2012, on ABC in the United States. It is produced by Blackie and Blondie Productions and Warner Bros. Television with series creators DeAnn Heline and Eileen Heisler as executive producers. 

The show features Frances "Frankie" Heck (Patricia Heaton), a working-class, Midwestern woman married to Mike Heck (Neil Flynn) who resides in the small fictional town of Orson, Indiana. They are the parents of three children, Axl (Charlie McDermott), Sue (Eden Sher), and Brick (Atticus Shaffer).

Cast

Main cast
 Patricia Heaton as Frankie Heck
 Neil Flynn as Mike Heck
 Charlie McDermott as Axl Heck
 Eden Sher as Sue Heck
 Atticus Shaffer as Brick Heck

Recurring cast
 Chris Kattan as Bob, Frankie's best friend at work
 Brock Ciarlelli as Brad, Sue's ex-boyfriend
 Blaine Saunders as Carly, Sue's best friend
 Jen Ray as Nancy Donahue, the Heck's neighbor
 Beau Wirick as Sean Donahue, Axl's best friend
 Brian Doyle-Murray as Don Elhert, owner of the car dealership where Frankie and Bob work
 Moises Arias as Matt, Sue's first real boyfriend
 John Gammon as Darrin, Axl's friend

Guest cast
 Ray Romano as Nicky Kohlbrenner, a not so pleasant blast from Frankie and Mike's past. He appears in flashbacks in "Forced Family Fun".
This episode is a reunion between Romano and Heaton, who played husband-and-wife duo Ray Barone and Debra Barone on Romano's sitcom, Everybody Loves Raymond (CBS, 1996-2005).
 Chord Overstreet as Mr. Wilkerson, Brick's fourth grade teacher. He appears in "Hecking Order".
 Mary-Pat Green as Mrs. Larimer, the principal of Orson Elementary. She appears in "The Test".
 Casey Sander as Jack Tracy, a football scout who interviews Axl. He appears in "The Test" and "Heck's Best Thing".
 Norm Macdonald as Rusty Heck, Mike's brother. He appears in "The Play" and "The Wedding".
 Marsha Mason as Pat Spence, Frankie's mother. She appears in "Major Changes" and "Thanksgiving III".
 Jerry Van Dyke as Tag Spence, Frankie's father. He appears in "Thanksgiving III".
 Molly Shannon as Janet, Frankie's sister. She appears in "Thanksgiving III".
 Ed Asner as Ben, the town's veteran newsman. He appears in "The Paper Route".
 Richard Gant as Pastor Watkins. He appears in "Get Your Business Done".
 Whoopi Goldberg as Mrs. Marsh, Sue's school guidance counselor. She appears in "The Guidance Counselor".
 John Cullum as Big Mike, Mike's father. He appears in "The Clover" and "The Wedding".
 Brandon Scott as Cory, a technician. He appears in "The Concert".
 Mary Birdsong as Marlene, Rusty's wife. She appears in "The Wedding".

Episodes

Ratings

References

External links

The Middle (TV series)
2011 American television seasons
2012 American television seasons